Perdido, also known as Perdido Station, is an unincorporated community and census-designated place in Baldwin County, Alabama, United States. Perdido has a post office with ZIP code 36562. It has an elementary school, Perdido School, which is part of the Baldwin County Board of Education.

Demographics

Notable people
Aimee Hall, "Floribama Shore" cast member.

History
Perdido is named after the Perdido River. A post office operated under the name Perdido Station from 1871 to 1923, and under the name Perdido from 1923 to present.

Cultural references

Perdido is the setting of author and screenwriter Michael McDowell's  Blackwater Series, first published in 1983. It takes place in Perdido, but in an alternative universe where the town grows and thrives into a major city between the 1920s and the 1970s.

References

Unincorporated communities in Baldwin County, Alabama
Unincorporated communities in Alabama